Pseudopleuronectes is a genus of righteye flounders mostly native to the northwestern Pacific Ocean with one species (P. americanus) found in the northwestern Atlantic Ocean.

Species
There are currently five recognized species in this genus:
 Pseudopleuronectes americanus (Walbaum, 1792) (Winter flounder)
 Pseudopleuronectes herzensteini (D. S. Jordan & Snyder, 1901) (Yellow-striped flounder)
 Pseudopleuronectes obscurus (Herzenstein, 1890)
 Pseudopleuronectes schrenki (P. J. Schmidt, 1904) (Cresthead flounder)
 Pseudopleuronectes yokohamae (Günther, 1877) (Marbled flounder)

References 

Pleuronectidae
Ray-finned fish genera
Taxa named by Pieter Bleeker